Sierra Leone–Turkey relations are the foreign relations between Sierra Leone and Turkey. Turkey has an embassy in Freetown since February 2018 and Sierra Leone has an embassy in Ankara since January 2020.

Diplomatic relations 
Sierra Leone and Turkey historically have had tense relations until recently. Turkey denounced Sierra Leone under Foday Sankoh, a Sierra Leonean who had trained as a guerrilla in Libya, because Foday Sankoh’s regime systematically turned children into murderers, force them to perform ritual cannibalism after amputating civilians’ arms and legs. To top it off, Foday Sankoh had been supplying cut-rate diamonds to al Qaeda, which Turkey classified as a terrorist organization, for resale in Europe. Turkey participated in the 6,000-man UN peacekeeping force, even though safety was not restored for a very long time.

Economic relations 
 Trade volume between the two countries was US$53.4 million in 2019.
 There are direct flights from Istanbul to Freetown.

See also 

 Foreign relations of Sierra Leone
 Foreign relations of Turkey

References

Further reading 
 Abdullah, Ibrahim, “Bush Path to Destruction: The Origin and Character of the Revolutionary United Front/Sierra Leone.” Journal of Modern African Studies 36, 2, 1998: pp. 203–235. 
 Abraham, Arthur, and E. D. A. Turay. The Sierra Leone Army: A Century of History. London: Macmillan, 1987.
 Alie, Joe A. D. A New History of Sierra Leone. London: Macmillan, 1990. 
 Binns, Margaret, and Tony Binns. Sierra Leone. Oxford, England: Clio, 1992. 
 Hair, Paul E. H. “Contributions to Sierra Leone History.” Journal of the Historical Society of Sierra Leone, 2, 2, 1978: pp. 61–66. Jones, Adam, and Peter K. Mitchell. Sierra Leone Studies at Birmingham, 1985. 
 Lansana, Musa S., and Musa J. Lansana. The Invasion of Sierra Leone: A Chronicle of Events of a Nation under Siege. Washington, DC: Sierra Leone Institute for Policy Studies, 1993.
 Rakita, Sara. Forgotten Children of War: Sierra Leonean Refugee Children in Guinea. New York: Human Rights Watch, 1999. 
 Riley, S., and Max Sesay. “Sierra Leone: The Coming Anarchy.” Review of African Political Economy 22, 63, 1995.

Sierra Leone–Turkey relations
Turkey
Bilateral relations of Turkey